The 2023 New Zealand Men's National League is the third scheduled season of the National League since its restructuring in 2021; the 2021 National League was cancelled due to the COVID-19 pandemic in northern regions. 32 clubs compete in the competition, with four qualifying from the Northern League, three qualifying from the Central League and two qualifying from the Southern League for the National Championship phase.
Each team can field a maximum of four foreign players as well as one additional foreign player who has Oceania Football Confederation nationality. 
Over the course of the season, each team must also ensure players aged 20 or under account for 10% of available playing minutes.

Qualifying leagues

2023 Northern League

Northern League teams
Twelve teams are competing in the league – the top ten teams from the previous season and the two teams promoted from the 2022 NRFL Division 1. The promoted teams are West Coast Rangers and Manurewa. It's Manurewa's first and West Coast Rangers second season (after releagtion in 2021) in the National League. They replaced Waiheke United (relegated after their debut season on the Northern League) and North Shore United (relegated after a two-year Northern League spell).

Northern League personnel and kits

Managerial changes

Northern League table

Northern League results table

2023 Central League

Central League teams 
Ten teams are competing in the league – the top nine teams from the previous season and the one team promoted from the 2022 play-off between the winners of the Central Federation League and the Capital Premier. The winner of the play-off was Stop Out. This is their first season in the Central League, since New Zealand football’s restructuring in 2021. They replaced Havelock North Wanderers (relegated to the Capital Premier League after one season in the Central League). Wellington United was entered as one of the originally 10 teams to play the 2023 season but withdrew in 2022. They were replaced by Whanganui Athletic who had originally missed out on promotion to Stop Out.

Central League personnel and kits

Central League table

Central League results table

2023 Southern League

Southern League teams 
Ten teams are competing in the league – the top nine teams from the previous season and the winner of the Southern League play-offs. The promoted team is FC Twenty 11. This is their first season in the Southern League. They replaced Mosgiel (relegated after their debut season in the Southern League).

Southern League personnel and kits

Southern League table

Southern League results table

Qualified clubs
There are 10 men’s National League Championship qualifying spots (4 for the Northern League, 3 plus Wellington Phoenix Reserves for the Central League and 2 for the Southern League).

Championship phase

League table

References

2022–23 in New Zealand association football
New Zealand
New Zealand National League seasons